Gez Boland or Gaz Boland may refer to:
 Gez Boland, Bushehr
 Gez Boland, Fars
 Gaz Boland, Shahr-e Babak, Kerman Province
 Gaz Boland, Dehaj, Shahr-e Babak County, Kerman Province